Engelbert Henryk Szolc (born 26 April 1943) is a Polish former handball player who competed in the 1972 Summer Olympics.

He was born in Ruda Śląska.

In 1972 he was part of the Polish team which finished tenth in the Olympic tournament. He played all five matches and scored eleven goals.

External links
 profile

1943 births
Living people
Polish male handball players
Olympic handball players of Poland
Handball players at the 1972 Summer Olympics
Sportspeople from Ruda Śląska
20th-century Polish people